Duffy the Disney Bear (ダッフィー) is a Disney Parks stuffed bear that can be found at the Tokyo Disney Resort, Hong Kong Disneyland, Disneyland Paris, Shanghai Disneyland, Disney Cruise Line and formerly at Disneyland and Disney California Adventure Park in California, and Walt Disney World in Florida.

Duffy has two Mickey Mouse features, similarly shaped face and hip Mickey birthmark. Duffy is unique among Disney characters in that he was not first featured in a Disney movie or TV show until he made his television debut in the 2010 Disney Parks Christmas Day Parade. And on June 30, 2020, the Disney Parks posted on YouTube a stop motion short called "Morning Glories" featuring Duffy and Friends and then again in 2021 with another stop motion short called "Spring Surprise".

History
The Disney Bear was originally created for and briefly sold at Walt Disney World's Downtown Disney Once Upon a Toy shop in Orlando in 2002 as a unique product for its opening. With The Oriental Land Company executives looking for fresh ideas and the teddy bears being culturally popular, the company adopted the character in 2004, giving it a name, a sailor suit and a backstory. They aggressively marketed it in the Tokyo DisneySea park. He was added as a walk-around character, becoming a regular character in 2005. In 2005, the bear, as "My First Disney Bear," was the boys' substitute toy given out at the Perfectly Princess Tea Party at Disney's Grand Floridian Resort and Spa. As Duffy's popularity grew, executives started to retheme a bit the "Old Cape Cod" area at Tokyo DisneySea to add Duffy, which included changing the show "Donald's Boat Builders" at the Cape Cod Cook-Off Theatre to "My Friend Duffy", which tells the story of how Duffy comes to life. And due to Duffy's popularity amongst Japanese fans, limits were set on the number a guest could buy. Women aged 20 to 35 lined up at stores with any new costume release.

Through the One Disney theme-park/corporate initiative of sharing IP/ideas, Duffy the Disney Bear was exported to the other Disney Parks. Duffy was released at the American Disney Parks on October 14, 2010. He then joined Hong Kong Disneyland Resort on November 19, 2010. In 2012, he appeared in Disneyland Paris. And during the Disney Dreamers Everywhere event in 2013, ShellieMay joined in.

DisneySea began expanding the Duffy Universe. On January 15, 2010, ShellieMay was announced and on January 22 debuted in the park as Duffy's friend.  The Disney Bear was the first of three Duffy and Friends toys to be introduced at Tokyo DisneySea. On June 30, 2014, they introduced Gelatoni the Cat. And then StellaLou the Bunny, was introduced on March 23, 2017, as part of the Easter celebration.

The next three friends debuted at other Disney Parks and Resorts. On April 30, 2018, Hong Kong Disneyland debuted CookieAnn the Dog. 'Olu Mel the Turtle was introduced at Aulani on July 17, 2018. Recently on June 15, 2021, a new friend for Duffy was announced to appear soon at Shanghai Disneyland as part of the 5th anniversary. Later on September 18, 2021, it was revealed online that the new friend would be LinaBell the Fox, who made her official debut in Shanghai on September 29.

The Disney Bear's backstory (2002–2004)
Duffy was previously known as "The Disney Bear" with an entirely different backstory. One day in Magic Kingdom, Mickey Mouse was walking around with his favorite teddy bear and wishing he had a best friend. Tinker Bell appeared and Mickey asked her for a friend, so she sprinkled pixie dust on the bear. The bear transformed into Mickey's silhouette and came to life. Mickey and the bear went on lots of adventures together in Magic Kingdom.

Duffy Bear's backstory (2004–present)
As the current Duffy story goes, Mickey Mouse was a sea captain who sometimes felt lonely because he would miss his friends, family, and especially his sweetheart, Minnie Mouse. So one day, Minnie decided to make a special teddy bear for Mickey. She also made a bottle with a letter that said "I hope this bear gives you happiness and luck!". She placed everything in a duffel bag. When Mickey got his present, he was very happy and decided to name the bear Duffy. That night while he was asleep, Mickey had a dream that Duffy came to life dressed up as a sailor and said to him, "Mickey, let's go on adventures together!". The next day when Mickey woke up, the bear looked exactly like he had in the dream! Mickey swears, even to this day, that when he turned around, the bear winked at him. Mickey didn't feel lonely anymore and went on many adventures with Duffy, taking photos everywhere. When Mickey came back home, he showed his friends all the adventures he had with Duffy. His friends all said good things about the bear, but Goofy said it best: "Gawrsh, that Duffy is one special bear!". Soon everybody wanted a Duffy bear, so Minnie got to work with Daisy Duck making Duffys for everyone. Every day, she would receive photos of their adventures with Duffy. Sometimes, if you're lucky, you can see Duffy walking back home from his adventures. But how? He is just a teddy bear right? Well if you see him, you might also say "That Duffy is one special bear!"

Duffy's friends and others
All characters in Duffy and Friends are plush toys but come to life in Mickey's imagination as well as in our imagination. (For Tippy Blue, see below.)
ShellieMay (January 22, 2010 debut @ Tokyo DisneySea) is a tan female teddy bear with a green bow and a seashell pendant, was made by Minnie Mouse for Duffy. Although Duffy and ShellieMay may be mistakenly seen as sweethearts, they are just good friends. (In fact, there are no romantic relationships among any of the characters in Duffy and Friends.) ShellieMay lives in Cape Cod in American Waterfront (Tokyo DisneySea).
 Gelatoni (June 30, 2014 @ Tokyo DisneySea) is an artistic and creative green Tuxedo cat with a blue beret who sees beauty in everything. He is from Palazzo Canals in Mediterranean Harbor (Tokyo DisneySea)
 StellaLou (March 23, 2017 @ Tokyo DisneySea) is a lavender rabbit with a blue flower, a tutu, and ballet shoes. She is determined to become a dancer, for which she doesn't hesitate to work hard. She made limited appearances until August 31, 2017. On August 10, 2017, StellaLou made her first appearance at Hong Kong Disneyland. She is from New York in American Waterfront (Tokyo DisneySea).
 CookieAnn (April 30, 2018 @ Hong Kong Disneyland) is a yellow dog with a chef's hat who loves to combine different things to come up with unique recipes and ideas. She is from Main Street U.S.A (Hong Kong Disneyland). Her name was originally Cookie until it was changed to CookieAnn in 2019.
 'Olu Mel (July 27, 2018 @ Aulani, A Disney Resort and Spa) is a shy turtle who loves making music with his ukulele. He feels very close to nature, and sometimes, he can play music with it. He is often found in Hawaii at Aulani. His costume character first appeared in Shanghai Disneyland on September 1, 2020, for Duffy Month. His name was originally 'Olu, until it was changed to 'Olu Mel.
LinaBell (September 29, 2021 @ Shanghai Disneyland) is a smart pink fox with a purple orchid who loves to solve problems and mysteries by finding clues using her trademark magnifying glass.
Tippy Blue is a secondary character in Duffy and Friends. He is not a plush toy like the rest of the characters in Duffy and Friends. Tippy Blue is a mailman seagull character who at times carelessly makes mistakes despite his good intentions. He has appeared in some Duffy stories and has narrated in the My Friend Duffy show in Cape Cod (Tokyo DisneySea).

Park attractions
 "My Friend Duffy" show (at the Cape Cod Cook-Off Theatre in Cape Cod at Tokyo DisneySea)
 Meet and Greet (Tokyo DisneySea American Waterfront in front of the S.S. Columbia)
 Meet and Greet (Epcot's World Showcase) ended Saturday, October 3, 2015
 Meet and Greet "My Journeys with Duffy" (Main Street Cinema, Hong Kong Disneyland) Duffy with ShellieMay and Gelatoni; They were joined by StellaLou on 10 August 2017, Cookie (later renamed CookieAnn) on 3 July 2018, and 'Olu Mel (originally named 'Olu prior to arriving in Hong Kong) on 20 November 2020.
 "Steps To Shine!" show (a show at the American Waterfront that is a successor to the previous show, "A Table Is Waiting" ). It ran from July 11, 2017, to March 19, 2018. It would be replaced by another show, "Hello, New York!" 
 The Duffy and Friends Show (near the entrance of Shanghai Disneyland). It started sometime in May 2017.
 Duffy and Friends: Celebrating Together show (near the entrance of Shanghai Disneyland). It ran from September 2 to September 30, 2020, for the Duffy Month. This is the first time CookieAnn and 'Olu Mel speak.
 Duffy's Bedtime Story (a show at the Disneyland Paris hotel). This is the first time Duffy and ShellieMay speak in English.
 Duffy's Pre-Splashing Parade (a show that only runs in the summer at Shanghai Disneyland)
 A Duffy and Friends Celebration (a show that at the Storybook Theatre at Hong Kong Disneyland)
 Meet and Greet (on a boat at Tokyo DisneySea's Mediterranean Harbor). A temporary way to meet Duffy, ShellieMay, Gelatoni, StellaLou, and Oul Mel due to the COVID-19 pandemic restrictions.

References

External links
Duffy and Friends (Official website for Duffy and Friends in Japanese)
Duffy's Friends – Walt Disney Imagineering
Duffy The Disney Bear – Walt Disney Imagineering
Duffy and Friends (Hong Kong Disneyland)

Characters of the Disney theme parks
Disney merchandise
Teddy bears
Disney California Adventure
Fictional bears
Fictional characters introduced in 2002
Disney core universe characters